Akolisa Ufodike  (born October 6, 1973, in Maiduguri) is a Nigerian-Canadian entrepreneur, academic, finance executive and politician. He is a director of Kainji Resources, an oil and gas company in Nigeria.

He currently serves as assistant professor of auditing (data analytics) and public policy and law at York University in Toronto.

Early life and career 
Ufodike was born in 1973 in Maiduguri to the family of Colonel Leonard Ufodike and Ebele Ufodike of Umudim and Otolo, Nnewi.

Education 
Ufodike attended Nigerian Military School, Zaria and Nigerian Defence Academy, Kaduna. In 2006, he attended and obtained Bachelor of Commerce from Laurentian University, Canada. In 2008, he obtained a Master of Business Administration degree from Cornell University and in 2017, obtained a Doctor of Philosophy in Management degree from University of Calgary.

Career and employment 
After graduating from Nigerian Defence Academy, Ufodike started a career in banking, working for Intercontinental Merchant Bank in Onitsha. He sits on the provincial audit committee for Alberta and is also a board member of the Canadian Nigerian Chamber of commerce helping in the facilitation of trade between Canada and Nigeria.

In 2015, he ran for the Alberta provincial election.

Membership 
Ufodike is a member of the Institute of Corporate Directors Canada, Chartered Professional Accountant Canada, Certified Professional Accountant USA and Certified Chartered Accountant UK.

Award and recognition 
 Fellowships of CPA Canada (FCPA)
 Fellowship of CGA Canada (FCGA)

References 

1973 births
Living people
Nigerian politicians
People from Nnewi
Cornell University alumni